SM the Ballad Vol. 2 – Breath is the second extended play by the South Korean project group SM the Ballad. It was released on February 13, 2014 with the song "Breath" as the lead single.

Background
Two of the tracks are written in three different languages and have three versions, with the languages being Korean, Chinese, and Japanese. "Breath" is the first and most heavily promoted song of the two, the Korean version is sung by Taeyeon and Jonghyun; the Chinese version by Chen and Zhang Liyin, while the Japanese version is sung by Max Changmin and Krystal. The other less promoted song is "Blind", with both the Korean and Japanese versions sung by Yesung, and recorded prior to his military enlistment. The Chinese version of "Blind" is sung by Zhou Mi.

Taeyeon and Jonghyun's duet "Breath" (Korean version) was the first track to be released on the 10th of February, with Jonghyun and Chen's duet "A Day Without You" being released on the 11th, and Taeyeon's solo "Set Me Free" being released on the 12th. A Mandarin version of "Set Me Free" sung by Zhang Liyin was released exclusively online on Baidu Music on the 13th. The full EP was released on February 13, 2014.

Promotions

Taeyeon and Jonghyun performed "Breath" for the first time on M Countdown on the 13th of February. Chen and Zhang Liyin also performed the Chinese version of "Breath" on the live broadcast of Chinese Hunan TV's The Lantern Festival the day after.
The song was also promoted on the shows KBS's Music Bank, Music Core and Inkigayo in February.

Track listing

Korean version

Chinese version

Complete version

Charts

Single chart

Album chart

Sales and certifications

Credits and personnel 
Max Changmin – vocals
Yesung – vocals
Zhang Liyin – vocals
Taeyeon – vocals
Zhou Mi – vocals
Jonghyun – vocals
Krystal – vocals
Chen – vocals

References

External links
 
 
 

2014 EPs
Korean-language EPs
SM Entertainment EPs
Genie Music EPs